"New to This Town" is a song co-written and recorded by American country music artist Kix Brooks. It was released in March 2012 as the first single and title track from his album of the same name, the first album released by Brooks after his departure from Brooks & Dunn.  It is his first solo chart entry since "Sacred Ground" in 1989.  Brooks wrote this song with Terry McBride and Marv Green.

Content
The song is a mid-tempo where the narrator wishes that he were "new to this town" so that he would not have to deal with memories of a former lover. Co-writer Marv Green said that he was inspired to write the song after seeing a U-Haul truck at a café, and thinking about what it would be like to be new to a town. It features Joe Walsh on slide guitar.

Critical reception
Karlie Justus Marlowe of Engine 145 gave the song a "thumbs up", saying that it was an "original take on the small town love narrative", while comparing Brooks' voice to David Nail.

Music video
According to Taste of Country, "the singer happens upon a variety of circumstances, which then take place in reverse."

Chart performance

References

2012 singles
Kix Brooks songs
Joe Walsh songs
Songs written by Kix Brooks
Songs written by Marv Green
Songs written by Terry McBride (musician)
Arista Nashville singles
2012 songs